George Lewis Cross  (January 9, 1872 – October 9, 1930) was a professional baseball player. He was a pitcher for the Cincinnati Reds of the National League in 1893 and 1894. He played in the minors through 1900, mostly in the Western League.

References

1872 births
1930 deaths
Major League Baseball pitchers
Baseball players from New Hampshire
Cincinnati Reds players
19th-century baseball players
Manchester Amskoegs players
Tacoma Daisies players
Charleston Seagulls players
Indianapolis Hoosiers (minor league) players
Indianapolis Indians players
Grand Rapids Bob-o-links players
St. Paul Apostles players
Chatham Reds players
St. Paul Saints (Western League) players
Columbus Buckeyes (minor league) players
Columbus Senators players
Grand Rapids Furniture Makers players
Montreal Royals players
People from Sanbornton, New Hampshire